West Stowe is a locality in the Gladstone Region, Queensland, Australia.

History 
The locality was named and bounded on 27 August 1999. It most likely takes its name from the parish.

Geography
The Calliope River forms the southern boundary and most of the eastern.

Road infrastructure
The Bruce Highway passes through the south of the locality, while the Gladstone–Mount Larcom Road (State Route 58) runs along part of the northern boundary.

References 

Gladstone Region
Localities in Queensland